This article shows all participating team squads at the 2001 Men's European Water Polo Championship.

























See also
 2001 Women's European Water Polo Championship squads

References

Men
Men's European Water Polo Championship
European Water Polo Championship squads